Kantar Group is a data analytics and brand consulting company, based in London, England. It was founded in 1992, and has approximately 30,000 employees in 100 countries working in various research disciplines, including social media monitoring, advertising effectiveness, consumer and shopper behaviour, and public opinion. 

Kantar has been majority owned by Bain Capital Private Equity since July 2019, when WPP sold a 60% stake of the company for $3.1 billion, at a valuation of $4.0 billion.

History

Leadership
On 24 October 2018 it was announced that the WPP board approved the plans to sell Kantar Group. In Dec 2019, Eric Salama stepped down as the CEO of Kantar Group. Eric Salama has been with Kantar since it was bought by WPP in 1988.

In January 2020, Ian Griffiths (former CFO and COO at ITV) was named Chief Financial Officer of Kantar, while Adam Crozier was appointed Chairman. In October 2020, Kantar announced the appointment of Alexis Nasard as Chief Executive Officer, effective 30 December 2020. Nasard subsequently stepped down as CEO of Kantar on 27 April 2021.

In July 2021, Chris Jansen was appointed to replace Alexis Nasard as CEO, effective 1 November 2021.

Acquisitions
British Market Research Bureau Limited – BMRB, which was established in 1933, London, were acquired by the group in 2009 and merged into Kantar Public in 2016. The subsidiary TGI – Target Group Index of BMRB, which was established in 1969, was split and merged into the Kantar Media brand in 2009.

In December 2019, the Kantar Group acquired the market research company Colmar Brunton Australia as part of its acquisition of WPPAUNZ's Data Investment Management division. In February 2020, Colmar Brunton in Australia was fully integrated into Kantar, with the Colmar Brunton brand being retired in Australia. The following year, Kantar acquired Colmar Brunton's New Zealand parent company.

In July 2021, Kantar completed the acquisition of its U.S. based rival Numerator (valued at $1.5 Billion) from Vista Equity Partners, aiming to strengthen its Worldpanel and Advertising Intelligence divisions with US and Canada in focus. The terms of deal were not disclosed.

In January 2022, Kantar announced it had acquired MindIT, a spin-out from the University of Bologna that specializes in machine-learning algorithms and AI.

In April 2022, Kantar announced it had acquired the Copenhagen-based marketing measurement and optimisation company, Blackwood Seven.

In May 2022, Kantar announced it had acquired Qmee.

Sales
On 10 May 2022, Kantar announced that it had agreed to sell its Kantar Public subsidiary to private equity firm Trilantic Europe. The proposed transaction is expected to close in the third quarter of 2022 subject to completion of the relevant shareholder, legal and regulatory processes, and employee representatives’ consultations where necessary. Financial terms of the transaction have not been disclosed.

Office locations

Kantar has offices in 90 markets, including the UK & Ireland, North America, India, Spain, France, Italy, China and Brazil. The global headquarters is located at London.

Operations
In April 2019, Kantar unified all its legacy brands, such as Kantar TNS, Kantar Millward Brown, Kantar Media and Kantar Worldpanel, into Kantar. Work conducted with clients in governments, the public sector, NGOs and NFPs, is led by Kantar Public, Kantar's specialist division which advises on the delivery of public policy, programmes, services and communications to the public.

Kantar Insights 
By 2019, Kantar merged the operations of IMRB, Millward Brown and TNS, and Kantar’s parent company WPP merged its media and advertising subsidiary GroupM with Kantar to form a global Kantar Analytics Practice. Following similar exercises across the globe, Kantar reduced the sub brands from 18 to 9 by 2019

Kantar IMRB 
Kantar IMRB (formerly "IMRB International" and "Indian Market Research Bureau") is a multi-country market research, survey and business consultancy firm established in 1970 that offers a range of syndicated data and customized research services. With over 1200 employees, IMRB is one of the largest providers of market research in India in an industry estimated to be worth a minimum of $187 million. As the oldest extant market research company in India, IMRB has been responsible for establishing the first and only household panel, the first television audience measurement system and the first radio panel in the country. IMRB International's specialized areas are consumer markets, industrial marketing, business-to-business marketing, social marketing and rural marketing.

Kantar Millward Brown 
Kantar Millward Brown was founded in Warwick, England in 1973 and acquired by WPP Group in 1990. In 2004, WPP backed Millward Brown acquired strategic marketing research and consulting firm, MaPS - Marketing and Planning Systems based at Boston In 2015, the experts from MaPS were moved to Millward Brown Analytics. Kantar Millward Brown, now part of Kantar's Insights Division, is a global research agency specialising in advertising, marketing communications, media and brand equity research. Kantar Millward Brown works across a range of industries and categories, and has a number of specialist practices.

Kantar TNS 
In 2008, Kantar TNS (Taylor Nelson Sofres) was acquired by WPP and included in Kantar. In February 2009, Kantar merged TNS and Research International.

Kantar Consulting
Kantar Consulting was formerly Kantar Vermeer, Kantar Added Value, Kantar Retail and Kantar Futures, and was a marketing and sales consultancy.

Kantar Added Value 
In October 2004, three Kantar companies – Added Value, Icon Brand Navigation and Diagnostic Research – combined under the "Added Value" name. Kantar Added Value focused on brand marketing, consumer insight, innovation and communications optimisation.

Kantar Futures 
Kantar Futures offered subscription services and consulting regarding future trends. Formerly known as The Futures Company, Kantar Futures was formed through the integration of The Henley Centre, HeadlightVision, Yankelovich and TRU.

Kantar Vermeer 
In 2014, Millward Brown acquired EffectiveBrands Holding B.V., a marketing strategy consulting firm headquartered in Amsterdam. Millward Brown merged EffectiveBrands with Millward Brown Optimor, its strategy consulting unit, to form Millward Brown Vermeer.

Kantar Retail 
Kantar Retail was headquartered in London and has over 400 employees and offices in 15 markets around the globe.

Kantar Health
Kantar Health (now Kantar's Health Division) provides data, analytics, and research to the life sciences industry. As of December 2020, Cerner announced that it will acquire Kantar Health, acquisition is expected to close in the first half of 2021. On 1 April, 2021 Cerner completed the acquisition of Kantar’s Health Division and has re-branded to Cerner Enviza.

Kantar Media
Kantar Media (now Kantar's Media division) offers a range of media insights and audience measurement services through the analysis of print, radio, TV, internet, cinema, mobile, social and outdoor media worldwide. Kantar Media was formed from WPP Group's acquisition of TNS Media and KMR Group in 2010. Kantar Media became Kantar's re branded insight, media evaluation and audience measurement company. In 2014, Kantar Media acquired a majority stake in the issued share capital of Precise Media Group Holdings Limited ("Precise") in a £70 Million deal. In the same year, Kantar Media acquired IBOPE Media, the main TV audience and ad investment measurement company in Brazil.  Kantar Media has within it organizational subsidiaries, such as Kantar Media North America, which are legal corporate entities in their own right. 

In January 2022, Symphony Technology Group acquired Kantar Reputation Intelligence, a media monitoring and analysis subsidiary of Kantar. The deal was finalized on Dec 31, 2021 and the merged company will operate under the name Onclusive.

Kantar Worldpanel 
Kantar Worldpanel (formerly TNS Worldpanel) runs continuous consumer panels and specializes in shopper behavior. The Worldpanel division measures and advises on consumer and shopper behaviour, offering insight-based consulting on clients' marketing and business strategies.

Kantar Profiles 
Kantar Profiles (former Lightspeed) was founded in 2000 and is headquartered in Warren, New Jersey, United States. The company operates in North America, Europe and Asia. It provides online market research services, specializing in using the Internet as a data collection platform to provide research through building and maintaining panels subject to quality and representative sampling standards.

Specialty panels range across industry sectors such as financial services, health care, business-to-business, automotive, family and more. Kantar Profiles (former Lightspeed) also provides custom panels to address specific client needs. In 2007, it conducted over 20 million online surveys for clients.

References 

WPP plc
Market research companies of the United Kingdom
Research and analysis firms of the United Kingdom